Mondo et autres histoires is a 1978 short story collection by French author J. M. G. Le Clézio. The stories in this collection all concern adolescents who in one way or another leave their familiar (civilized) circumstances and have numinous experiences accompanied by a rite of passage or other initiation.

Contents and themes
In "Lullaby" a young girl leaves the busy town for the sea, and a meditative experience (compared to passages in Thoreau's Walden and Rousseau's Reveries of a Solitary Walker) lets her realize a transformed way of respiration after which a journey ensues along rocks with mysterious inscriptions, a bunker, a white villa, a Greek temple, and other places of self-discovery. An encounter with a threatening man prompts her to jump from a cliff and crawl back to her village just before she, apparently, is to understand the meaning of her journey.

Likewise, "The Boy Who Had Never Seen the Sea" is a story of a boy "who runs away from school to be near the sea"; this story was translated into English and published by The New Yorker in 2008.

Stories
"Mondo"
"Lullaby"
"La montagne du dieu vivant"
"La roue d'eau"
"Celui qui n'avait jamais vu la mer" ("The Boy Who Had Never Seen the Sea")
"Hazaran"
"Peuple du ciel"
"Les bergers"

"Mondo" was the basis for the movie of the same name by Tony Gatlif
"Peuple du ciel" and "Les Bergers" were also published separately.

Publication history

First French edition: 
Second French edition: 
Third French edition: 
Fourth French edition: 12th re-Print Gallimard, Paris 2008 (With new author biography) and 2000 (Reprint: 1982 ed)
Fifth French edition: 
Sixth French edition:   With new author biography
First English edition:

Reception
Mondo has been generally well received. Booklist wrote "This collection of stories by the recipient of the 2008 Nobel Prize in Literature may not be to everyone's goût, but no one who reads it will complain about the quality of the writing." and "Anderson's elegant translation conveys the detailed, physical, fluid, and complex lushness of the language, which may engage and satisfy readers of Garcia Marquez and other master stylists." Publishers Weekly called it a"vivid, subtle collection".  The Washington Post described the stories as "strange, hypnotic, overtly poetic pieces" and concludes "In Le Clezio’s fictional universe, the world exists in a prelapsarian state of timeless grace, at least until the inevitably corrupt and destructive world of adults comes crashing in."  Library Journal found that "his quiet explorations of beauty and culture are freshly, conversationally written."

References

1978 short story collections
Short story collections by J. M. G. Le Clézio
Works by J. M. G. Le Clézio